James Michael Doyle (born 1 August 1991) is a Scottish footballer who plays as a defender for Alloa Athletic on loan from Scottish Championship side Hamilton Academical. His youth career was spent at Celtic, then Kilmarnock, without having made any first-team appearances. Doyle has since played for Alloa Athletic, St Johnstone, Greenock Morton, Queen of the South, Falkirk and Queen's Park.

Career
Doyle began his career as a youth player with Celtic before joining Kilmarnock at under-19 level.

Stirling Albion
In January 2011, Doyle signed on loan for Scottish First Division club Stirling Albion and made his first-team debut  on 2 January 2011, in a 4–2 defeat versus Falkirk. Doyle featured in 19 league matches for the Binos.

Alloa Athletic
On 12 July 2011, Doyle signed for Scottish Third Division club Alloa Athletic after impressing on trial during pre-season. Doyle's first-team debut was on 23 July 2011, versus Peterhead in the Challenge Cup and his league debut was on 6 August 2011, versus Stranraer in a 3–2 win at Stair Park. Doyle scored his first competitive goal on 17 September 2011, versus Queen's Park. Doyle featured in 132 league matches and scored two league goals for the Wasps.

St. Johnstone
Doyle signed for St Johnstone on 4 February 2016, as cover for club captain, Dave Mackay who had been ruled out for the rest of that season with a hip injury, although he eventually only featured in two league matches.

Greenock Morton
In May 2016, Doyle signed for Championship club Greenock Morton and although he extended his contract with the Greenock club for a further year, Doyle was then released in the close season of 2018, having featured in 64 league matches and scoring one goal.

Queen of the South
On 13 July 2018, Doyle signed a one-year contract with Dumfries club Queen of the South after featuring in two pre-season friendly matches at Palmerston Park versus Livingston and Hearts respectively.

Falkirk
On 21 June 2019, Doyle signed a two-year contract with Scottish League One club Falkirk.

Queen's Park

On 28 July 2020, Doyle signed for Queen's Park.

Hamilton Academical
In July 2022 Doyle moved to Hamilton Academical.

In February 2023, Doyle joined Alloa Athletic on loan until the end of the season.

Career statistics

Honours
Scottish Third Division: 2011–12

References

Living people
1991 births
Scottish footballers
Footballers from Glasgow
Association football defenders
Celtic F.C. players
Kilmarnock F.C. players
Stirling Albion F.C. players
Alloa Athletic F.C. players
St Johnstone F.C. players
Greenock Morton F.C. players
Queen of the South F.C. players
Falkirk F.C. players
Queen's Park F.C. players
Hamilton Academical F.C. players
Scottish Football League players
Scottish Professional Football League players